Green Room Blues is the second and final album from Michigan band The Deluxtone Rockets. Musically the album changes the bands' direction from swing to rockabilly and winds up sounding, according to CCM magazine, something like "Johnny Cash head butting with Buddy Holly" HM went further, stating that the transformation was "like comparing Britney Spears to Pedro the Lion."

The album has a sordid production history, as two of the producers died during production, Dennis Danell and Gene Eugene. The effort was eventually completed by Chris Colbert. The album is named after Gene Eugene's recording studio, The Green Room, in Huntington Beach, California. "Love Song" is a cover of the song by The Cure.

Track listing
 "Broken Heart"
 "Love Song"
 "Darkest Night"
 "2,000 Miles"
 "Downslide"
 "Costa Mesa"
 "Redemption"
 "Doing Time"
 "Open Road"
 "Wolftown Blues"
 "Judgement Day"

References

The Deluxtone Rockets albums
2001 albums
Tooth & Nail Records albums